Stone and sky was a Colombian literary movement that appeared in 1939 and whose name is taken from the title of a 1919 poetry book published by Juan Ramón Jiménez. Members of this literary movement were often called piedracielistas.

The movement corresponds to a generation of writer born between 1910 and 1915. There was no formal manifesto or school for the movement.

Characteristics of this group were, among many others, hypersensitivity, and emotion and insolence against consecrated and canonized forms.

Juan Lozano y Lozano was a prominent critic of the movement.

Authors

Notable works
Organized as an editorial, the authors who formed a part of this literary movement published their works in journals, including the following:

 La ciudad sumergida, Jorge Rojas (1911-1995)
 Territorio amoroso, Carlos Martín (1914- 2008)
 Presagio de amor, Arturo Camacho Ramírez (1910-1982)
 Seis elegías y un himno, Eduardo Carranza (1913-1985)
 Regreso de la muerte, Tomás Vargas Osorio (1908-1941)
 El ángel desalado, Gerardo Valencia (1911-1994)
 Habitante de su imagen, Darío Samper (1909-1984)

See also
 Nadaism
 Colombian literature
 Latin American Boom

Colombian literature
Literary movements
Colombian culture